The Roaring Fifties is a 1983 West German comedy film directed by Peter Zadek and starring Juraj Kukura, Boy Gobert and Peter Kern. It is based on the novel Hurra, wir leben noch by Johannes Mario Simmel. It is set around the German Wirtschaftswunder economic miracle of the 1950s, with the title alluding to the Roaring Twenties.

It was shot at the Bavaria Studios in Munich and on location at Neuschwanstein Castle. The sets were designed by the art directors Herbert Strabel and Rolf Zehetbauer.

Cast

References

External links

1983 films
1983 comedy films
German comedy films
West German films
1980s German-language films
Films directed by Peter Zadek
Films scored by Klaus Doldinger
1980s business films
Films based on Austrian novels
Films set in the 1940s
Films set in the 1950s
Bavaria Film films
Constantin Film films
Films shot at Bavaria Studios
1980s German films